Kauffman Vodka is a Russian brand of vodka produced in Moscow, Russia by the WH Import Company, an import and wholesale company of alcohol in Russia. Introduced in 2000 by Dr. Mark Kauffman, Kauffman Vodka is produced in limited quantities.

Overview

Production 

Kauffman Vodka is produced from the wheat of a single harvest; thus, it has a specific vintage.

Availability 

Currently Kauffman Vodka is available in Germany, and in California, Arizona, Nevada, Montana, New York and Florida, in the United States.

Varieties 
Kauffman Vodka is available in many varieties. To date, the only variety available in the United States is the Kauffman Vodka Luxury Collection 80 Proof.

References 

Russian vodkas